The 2009 Club Premium Open was a professional tennis tournament played on outdoor red clay courts. It was part of the 2009 ATP Challenger Tour. It took place in Quito, Ecuador between 28 September and 4 October 2009.

Singles main draw entrants

Seeds

 Rankings are as of 21 September 2009.

Other entrants
The following players received wildcards into the singles main draw:
  Iván Endara
  Carlton Fiorentino
  Matías Sborowitz
  Juan-Sebastián Vivanco

The following players received entry from the qualifying draw:
  Guillermo Rivera Aránguiz
  Bruno Rodríguez
  Nicolás Todero
  Michael Quintero

Champions

Singles

 Carlos Salamanca def.  Sebastián Decoud, 7–6(4), 6–7(5), 6–4

Doubles

 Santiago González /  Travis Rettenmaier def.  Fernando Vicente /  Michael Quintero, 1–6, 6–3, [10–3]

External links
Official website
ITF Search 
2009 Draws

 
Club Premium Open
Club Premium Open
Clay court tennis tournaments
Tennis tournaments in Ecuador
Club Premium Open
Club Premium Open